"Wish You Were Here" is a popular song with music and lyrics by Harold Rome, the title tune from his 1952 show, Wish You Were Here. It was introduced in the show and on the RCA Victor cast album by Jack Cassidy.

The best-known version was recorded by Eddie Fisher becoming a #1 hit in 1952 on RCA Victor 47-4830 (45 rpm) and 20-4830 (78 rpm).

Other recordings 
 Guy Lombardo & His Royal Canadians (vocal by Kenny Martin) (1952). This charted briefly in the No. 26 position. 
 Judy Garland - Performed on The Bing Crosby Radio Hour on October 30th, 1952.
 Jane Froman (1952).  This charted briefly in the No. 25 spot. 
 Jimmy Young (1953).
 Kate Smith - for her album The Fabulous Kate (1958).
 Michael Feinstein - for his album Forever (1993).
 Peggy Lee - included in her album Latin ala Lee! (1960)

References

Songs written by Harold Rome
1952 songs
Eddie Fisher (singer) songs